The Member of the Wedding is a 1952 American drama film directed by Fred Zinnemann and starring Ethel Waters, Julie Harris, and Brandon De Wilde. The story, based on Carson McCullers' 1946 novel of the same name, is set in a small town in the Southern United States. Frankie Addams is an awkward, moody 12-year-old tomboy whose only friends are her young cousin John Henry and her black housekeeper Berenice. Co-starring as a drunken soldier who tries to take advantage of the vulnerable Frankie is former child actor Dick Moore, making his last film appearance.

Julie Harris was nominated for an Academy Award for her performance. Later versions of McCuller's play were done for television, with Claudia McNeil playing Berenice in 1958, then Pearl Bailey performing the part in 1982.

Plot
Feeling rejected when her older brother goes off on his honeymoon without inviting her along, Frankie (Julie Harris) runs away from her middle-class Southern home. She endures several other adolescent traumas, not least of which is the sudden death of her bespectacled young cousin John Henry (Brandon De Wilde). With the help of warm-hearted housekeeper Berenice Sadie Brown (Ethel Waters), Frankie eventually makes an awkward transition to young womanhood.

Cast

References

External links 
 
 
 
 

1952 films
1950s coming-of-age drama films
American black-and-white films
American coming-of-age drama films
American films based on plays
Columbia Pictures films
Films based on American novels
Films based on works by Carson McCullers
Films directed by Fred Zinnemann
Films produced by Stanley Kramer
Films scored by Alex North
Films set in Georgia (U.S. state)
Film noir
Films with screenplays by Edward Anhalt
Films with screenplays by Edna Anhalt
1952 drama films
1950s English-language films
1950s American films